Hajji Esmail Iman Khan (also Romanized as Ḩājjī Esmāʿīl Īmān Khān; also known as Ḩājj Īmān Khān) is a village in Qeshlaq-e Jonubi Rural District, Qeshlaq Dasht District, Bileh Savar County, Ardabil Province, Iran. At the 2006 census, its population was 91, in 19 families.

References 

Towns and villages in Bileh Savar County